Frogshall is a small hamlet within the civil parish of Northrepps in the English county of Norfolk. Craft Lane  runs through the hamlet between Northrepps and Southrepps. The nearest railway station is at Gunton on the Bittern Line which runs between Sheringham, Cromer and Norwich. The nearest airport is Norwich International Airport. The hamlet as part of the greater parish of Northrepps had in the 2011 census, a population of 886. For the purposes of local government, the hamlet falls within the district of North Norfolk.

Description
The hamlet is a small scattered settlement in the wooded valley of the River Mun in the south-east of the parish of Northrepps. Within the hamlet is the house called Templewood. Most of the houses were originally workers' cottages for the estate workers. Craft Lane gives road access to the hamlet from Southrepps and Northrepps.  The lane is also a designated Quiet Lane.

Templewood
Templewood house was built 1938 as shooting box and base for other country activities for Samuel Hoare, Lord Templewood by Paul Edward Paget of the architectural firm Seely & Paget. The house incorporates fragments from the old Bank of England by John Soane, and from Nuthall Temple which stood in  Nottinghamshire and was one of only four houses built in the United Kingdom generally said to have been inspired by Palladio's  Villa Capra in Vicenza. Nuthall Temple was demolished in 1929. The two sphinxes which flank the terrace in front of the portico were salvaged from Nuthall Temple. The four columns which support the portico were salvaged from Soane's Old Bank of England. The listed building is in excellent condition and is set in parkland and approached down a long chestnut tree-lined avenue.

Gallery

Wildlife 
Wildlife that can be seen in the locality include:

Birds
 Barn owl, buzzard, wood pigeon, kingfisher, tawny owl, heron

Animals
Rabbit, hare, hedgehog, mole, Chinese water deer, red deer, muntjac deer, fallow deer, badger, pipistrelle bat, grey squirrel

Public transport 
Bus

Services are provided by the following Sanders Coaches run between Cromer and North Walsham.
 Sanders coaches

Notable residents 
 Verily Anderson
 Paul Edward Paget
 Samuel Hoare, Lord Templewood

References 

Hamlets in Norfolk
Northrepps